18 Boötis is a single star in the northern constellation of Boötes, located about 85 light years away from the Sun. It is visible to the naked eye as a faint, yellow-white hued star with an apparent visual magnitude of 5.41. This object is a suspected member of the Ursa Major Moving Group, based on velocity criteria. It has a magnitude 10.84 optical companion at an angular separation of  along a position angle of 219°, as of 2010.

This is an F-type main-sequence star with a stellar classification of F3 V. Older surveys gave a class of F5 IV, showing the luminosity class of a subgiant star. It shows strong evidence for short-term chromospheric variability, although it is not optically variable.

18 Boötis is an estimated 1.15 billion years old and is spinning with a projected rotational velocity of 40.5 km/s. It has 1.3 times the mass of the Sun and 1.4 times the Sun's radius. The star is radiating 3.9 times the luminosity of the Sun from its photosphere at an effective temperature of 6,731 K. An infrared excess has been detected that suggests a cold debris disk is orbiting  from the host star with a blackbody temperature fit of 65 K.

References

F-type main-sequence stars
Circumstellar disks
Ursa Major Moving Group
Boötes
Durchmusterung objects
Bootis, 18
125451
069989
5365